Gloria, Laus et Honor is a Christian hymn composed and written by Theodulf of Orléans between 810 and 817, and sung as a processional for Palm Sunday, based on the story of Jesus's arrival in Jerusalem before his passion and death. It was most likely composed by Theodulph of Orléans in the early ninth century. The modern English hymn "All Glory, Laud and Honour" is based on a translation of this text.

Text 
Below are the words of the hymn as found in the Graduale Novum.

Refrain:

Verses:

Meter

The text is set in elegiac couplets, with each couplet comprising the traditional dactylic hexameter and dactylic pentameter. This use of this classical meter was uncommon in Christian hymn writing at the time.

References

External links
1914 Catholic Encyclopedia article
Latin text from the Roman Missal, with English translation by J. M. Neale (1818-1866)
Hymnology Archive

Latin-language Christian hymns
Palm Sunday hymns